Diacme phyllisalis is a moth in the family Crambidae. It was described by Francis Walker in 1859. It is found in Jamaica, Cuba and Mexico, as well the southeastern United States, where it has been recorded from Florida and Georgia.

References

Moths described in 1859
Spilomelinae